George Griffin was an African-American born into slavery in Virginia in 1849. In 1874, as a free man, Griffin came to work for Samuel L. Clemens (a.k.a. Mark Twain). Details of Griffin's early life remain largely unknown.  But there is much information about Griffin's later life, primarily from Clemens's letters and unpublished memoirs. For example, according to Clemens' unpublished manuscript A Family Sketch, Griffin "was a Maryland slave by birth; the Proclamation set him free, & as a young fellow he saw his fair share of the Civil War as body servant to General Devens". 

Griffin was a Deacon in the Metropolitan African Methodist Episcopal Church, active political leader, and family man. He married a dressmaker named Mary and had one daughter. He was remembered as having a knack for making money and lending funds back to the African American community. Clemens describes him as:

Griffin worked as the Clemens' family butler for 17 years and appears to have been very close to the family (even after Griffin purchased a house in the city, he maintained a room at Clemens's home in Hartford). This was the period in which Clemens wrote Adventures of Huckleberry Finn, and Griffin may have been an inspiration for the character Jim, one of two major characters in the novel. He died in 1897.

References

External links
Who Was "G.G., Chief of Ordnance"?

1849 births
1897 deaths
African-American Methodists
African Americans in the American Civil War
19th-century American slaves
People of Virginia in the American Civil War